Semiz Ali Pasha was an Ottoman statesman from the Sanjak of Bosnia who served as Grand Vizier of the Ottoman Empire from 1561 to 1565. He was the beylerbey (governor) of Egypt Eyalet from 1549 to 1553. Semiz Ali Pasha was born in Prača in Bosnia (thus his secondary epithet), and replaced Rüstem Pasha as a Grand Vizier. After palace schooling, he discharged high-level functions along the Ottoman Empire. His epithet "Semiz" means "fat" in Turkish. 

In 1561 he negotiated with the ambassador of the Holy Roman Empire, Ogier de Busbecq, on the terms of a peace treaty which was ratified in Vienna in the following year.

See also
 List of Ottoman Grand Viziers
 List of Ottoman governors of Egypt

References 

16th-century Grand Viziers of the Ottoman Empire
16th-century Ottoman governors of Egypt
Bosnian Muslims from the Ottoman Empire
Devshirme
Grand Viziers of Suleiman the Magnificent
Ottoman governors of Egypt
1565 deaths